A keycap is a small cover of plastic, metal, or other material placed over the keyswitch of a computer keyboard.  Keycaps are often illustrated to indicate the key function or alphanumeric character they correspond to. Early keyboards were manufactured with the keyswitch and keycap integrated in one unit; keycaps separate from the switch were introduced to facilitate the production of different keyboard layouts.

History 
Typical keycaps in the 1970s and 1980s were produced using two-shot molding, with the markings molded into each keycap in a different color of plastic. This eventually fell out of favor, as it was more expensive (particularly in tooling costs), and tended to produce keycaps more durable than the equipment on which they were mounted. Modern keycaps are usually labelled by stamping or laser engraving. However, two-shot molding ("doubleshot") keycaps are still available today, known for their feel and general durability.

Modern keycaps 
Keycaps can be bought in replacement sets for a keyboard. Notably, replacement sets are frequently sold for keyboards that use Cherry MX-style stems. Custom sets are bought and sold within the enthusiast communities, and artisan keycaps can be purchased individually.

Keycaps are sold in printed and unprinted varieties. The unprinted variety, known as "Blank Keycaps," is said to promote touch typing and help build muscle memory because the user is forced to rely on motion rather than visuals. There are many designs for you to choose from. From anime design, bi-color design, game-based design, and even custom keycap as you wish. However, within the modern mechanical keyboard community, unprinted caps are typically chosen for their visual appeal.

The most common plastics used are ABS, PBT and POM (see the  materials section).
The top of most keycaps may be described as cylinder-shaped (curving to the sides as if a fat cylinder was resting on it), flat or spherical (curving to the top, bottom and sides as if a large sphere was resting on it). The modern preference is for cylinder-shaped keycaps rather than spherical ones, but laptop keys are often flat.

Construction

Materials

Keycaps materials vary among the brands and provide different feels, durability, damage resistance, and other properties.

Printing of characters
Printing of numbers, letters, and symbols on the keycaps is done using pad printing, laser etching, or dye sublimation.

Key profile 
As its name suggests, the easiest way to compare key profiles is to look at them from the side. The keyboard profile refers to the profile shapes of each row of keycaps. With different profiles, keys can vary in size, shape, and thickness. When (most) modern key sets vary in profile from row to row, this is called a sculpted profile. 

 OEM
 Cherry
 Apple
 Tai Hao
 Alps
 Laser
 DCS
 SA
 SA-P
 DSA
 HSA
 XDA
 MT3

Further reading

References

Computer keyboards